A Saturday on Earth is a 1996 French drama film directed by Diane Bertrand. It was screened in the Un Certain Regard section at the 1996 Cannes Film Festival.

Cast
 Elsa Zylberstein - Claire
 Eric Caravaca - Martin
 Johan Leysen - Franck
 Kent - Arnaud
 Dominique Pinon - Le brigadier Morel
 Silvie Laguna - Agathe Morel
 Agathe Dronne - Cathy
 Lionel Abelanski - Michel
 Liliane Rovère - Claire's mother
 Sandrine Cukierman - Singer
 Julian Paget - The kid with the bike
 Victor Garrivier - Marcellin
 Louise Vincent - Yvonne
 César Chiffre - Mathieu
 Christine Letailleur - Marylène
 Dominique Bettenfeld - Bobby
 Hadrien Bertrand - The kid with the dog

References

External links

1996 films
1996 drama films
French drama films
1990s French-language films
Films directed by Diane Bertrand
1990s French films